Jabal Al-Qo'mah is a mountain of Saudi Arabia.

Administratively affiliated to the Al-Harajah Center in Dahran Governorate in Asir Region, this mountain is one of the highest mountains in the Kingdom of Saudi Arabia and like other mountains in the area lacks vegetation, but it is considered a tourist attraction for tourists climbing and exploring the villages of Raha Sanhan and Abdul Qadir. Several abandoned villages also dot the landscape, relic of a time when the area was used by caravans from Yemen traveling north.

References

Qomah